The 1988 PGA Championship was the 70th PGA Championship, held August 11–14 at Oak Tree Golf Club in Edmond, Oklahoma, a suburb north of Oklahoma City. Jeff Sluman shot a final round 65 (−6) to win his only major title, three strokes ahead of runner-up Paul Azinger, the 36-hole and 54-hole leader and former college teammate. Azinger was the reigning Player of the Year on the PGA Tour.

In the penultimate pairing on Sunday, Sluman was three strokes back at the start of the round. After a birdie at the second, he holed out for an eagle on the par-5 fifth, and when Azinger followed with a bogey, the two were tied at nine-under. Sluman had five birdies and an eagle with just one bogey in the final round while Azinger posted a second straight even-par 71. It was also the first of Sluman's six victories on the PGA Tour. In the final pair with Azinger, Dave Rummells shot 75 (+4) and fell to a tie for sixth.

Azinger won the title five years later, defeating Greg Norman in a playoff in 1993.

Course layout

Source:

Round summaries

First round
Thursday, August 11, 1988

Source:

Second round
Friday, August 12, 1988

Source:

Third round
Saturday, August 13, 1988

Source:

Final round
Sunday, August 14, 1988

Source:

Scorecard

Cumulative tournament scores, relative to par
Source:

References

External links
PGA.com – 1988 PGA Championship

PGA Championship
Golf in Oklahoma
PGA Championship
PGA Championship
PGA Championship
PGA Championship